Jabulani Shongwe (born 28 February 1990) is a South African soccer player who plays as a midfielder for South African club Highlands Park.

International career

International goals
Scores and results list South Africa's goal tally first.

References

1990 births
Living people
South African soccer players
Association football midfielders
Mamelodi Sundowns F.C. players
Bidvest Wits F.C. players
Lamontville Golden Arrows F.C. players
Chippa United F.C. players
Highlands Park F.C. players
People from Witbank
African Games silver medalists for South Africa
African Games medalists in football
Competitors at the 2011 All-Africa Games
South Africa A' international soccer players
2011 African Nations Championship players
2014 African Nations Championship players